Playing the Ponies is a 1937 short subject directed by Charles Lamont starring American slapstick comedy team The Three Stooges (Moe Howard, Larry Fine and Curly Howard). It is the 26th entry in the series released by Columbia Pictures starring the comedians, who released 190 shorts for the studio between 1934 and 1959.

Plot
The Stooges operate a failing restaurant, Flounder Inn restaurant and are plenty sick and tired of working there since they are making less money than usual. Two men (Nick Copeland, Lew Davis) walk in and order food as they look over a racing form. One man laments the state in which his horse, Thunderbolt, is in, claiming that he is "all run out" and that he wants to dump him off on some unsuspecting sap. This works in his favor when Larry opens a newspaper and reads a story on a horse named Mad Cap who won a race worth $10,000 ($ today). The Stooges then decide to sell their restaurant to Thunderbolt's owners and get into the horse racing industry.

Upon arriving at Thunderbolt's stable, they discover the horse is in a very poor condition with a bent back. Curly races the horse around the track. Curly misunderstands and runs alongside Thunderbolt, but he stops when Moe calls him over. Feeling hungry, Curly pulls out a handful of chili  snacks that he swiped from the restaurant, mistaking them for salted peanuts. However, Thunderbolt eats them first and, with his mouth burning, literally "runs like lightning" towards the nearest water trough. Moe demands to know what Curly gave the horse, but Curly still believes them to be peanuts. To be sure, Moe eats a handful and suffers the same heated mouth as Thunderbolt and runs to the trough. Curly follows suit, and blazes to the trough as well. The Stooges quickly discover that the  caused Thunderbolt's sudden burst of speed and believe it to be their ace in the hole for future races. Larry laughs at the Stooges for this, in which Moe gives those  in his mouth, causing him to almost drink a bottle of kerosene by accident.

Once the race starts, Thunderbolt turns around and starts running in the opposite direction. Larry stops him and feeds him the hot peppers, but the effect is too much for Thunderbolt and he is too disoriented to run. Moe and Curly grab a bucket of water, hop on a parked motorcycle and drive alongside of Thunderbolt with the bucket hanging from a pole in front of the horse. Thunderbolt wins the race, and the Stooges enjoy the good life as they each eat their own turkey and Thunderbolt eats oats out of a large bowl in celebration.

Production notes
Playing the Ponies was filmed on May 12–19, 1937. The film title is a straightforward slang expression meaning "betting on racehorses." It is the second and final Stooges film directed by veteran director Charles Lamont.

A colorized version of this film was released in 2004 as part of the DVD collection entitled "Goofs on the Loose."

Nick Copeland and Lew Davis reprise their roles from the last short, Cash and Carry as two con men who once again try to swindle the Stooges. Playing the Ponies would later be remake of 1937's  A Day at the Races starring The Marx Brothers (Groucho Marx, Chico Marx and Harpo Marx) release by MGM (the film were produced by MGM writer, film producer, director and "The Boy Wonder" Irving Thalberg who died in 1936 after the filming began).

References

External links
 
 

1937 films
1937 comedy films
The Three Stooges films
American black-and-white films
Films directed by Charles Lamont
Films about horses
Columbia Pictures short films
American comedy short films
1930s English-language films
1930s American films